Speyeria adiaste, the unsilvered fritillary or adiaste fritillary, is a species of butterfly of the family Nymphalidae. It is found in California north to San Mateo County and east to north Los Angeles County and Kern County.

The wingspan is 50–61 mm. Adults feed on flower nectar.

The larvae feed on Viola species, including Viola quercetorum.

Subspecies
Speyeria adiaste adiaste
†Speyeria adiaste atossa
Speyeria adiaste clemencei

References

Speyeria
Butterflies described in 1864
Butterflies of North America
Taxa named by William Henry Edwards